The Pennsylvania State Treasurer is the head of the Pennsylvania Treasury Department, an independent department of state government. The state treasurer is elected every four years. Treasurers are limited to two consecutive terms.

The Pennsylvania Treasury Department  
As the name "Treasury" suggests, the department's paramount responsibility is safeguarding and managing the state's financial assets, but Pennsylvania's constitution and statutes place additional specific responsibilities on the office.

Taxes and other sources of revenue collected by the state are deposited with the Treasury. The department uses that money to make payments on behalf of state government, including payroll for state employees and charges incurred by government agencies. Before issuing payments, Treasury's Bureau of Fiscal Review must carefully examine invoices to make certain the charges are lawful and correct.

While managing cash flow to ensure that enough money is on hand to meet financial obligations, Treasury also places funds in widely diversified short-term and long-term investments to earn income for state taxpayers. It also holds and/or invests funds for other government agencies, such as the state pension boards. As of 2014, Treasury is custodian of approximately $100 billion in public assets.

PA 529 College Savings Program 
The PA 529 College Savings Program gives families a tax-advantaged way to make college possible for their children.

Unclaimed property 
Treasury's Unclaimed Property Bureau works to reunite more than $2 billion in lost, forgotten and abandoned property with its rightful owners. Since 2009, Treasury has collected $1.134 billion in abandoned property and returned $518 million back to the rightful owners, netting $616 million for the state General Fund budget.

INVEST 
The INVEST program helps local governments and nonprofits invest their money with flexibility, security, and confidence. INVEST uses Treasury's professional investment expertise, minus the high costs of other investment programs. With less money spent on management fees, more money is spent on Pennsylvania's communities.

Responsibilities 
 Conducting investigations of loss, theft, or fraud involving commonwealth checks.
 Reviewing and approving real estate leases and sole source contracts entered into by commonwealth agencies before such leases and contracts can become effective.
 Housing the Pennsylvania Contracts e-Library. In response to the new Right-to-Know Law signed by Governor Ed Rendell on February 14, 2008, Treasury is required to make available certain government contract information for public inspection by posting it on a publicly accessible Web site.

State boards 
The department's reach also extends to the many state boards on which the treasurer serves. For example, as the chairperson of the Board of Finance and Revenue, the treasurer directs the selection of the banks where state funds are deposited and sets the interest rates paid on them. The treasurer also serves on boards that oversee state pension funds and has a voice in how these funds are managed and invested. Other board-related activities allow the treasurer to help provide Pennsylvania schools with tax-exempt financing for modernization, make grants to distressed communities, and finance the purchase of rental housing for residents in need.

Other services 
The Treasury provides several other services to state residents, such as financial education programs for individuals and businesses, and a debit card for recipients of unemployment compensation and workers compensation benefits. It makes low-interest loans available for energy efficiency improvements in residential homes through Keystone HELP, and invests in energy upgrades in college and university buildings through its Campus Energy Efficiency Fund.

List of Pennsylvania Treasurers

References

External links 

 The Pennsylvania Treasury Department

Treasurer